John Greed (born 14 November 1966) is a contemporary jewelry designer and retailer. He was born in Wimbledon, London and graduated from the School of Art and Design in London. He later founded John Greed Design Ltd, which has since become a major UK retailer of jewellery.

Education
Greed was educated at Newland House School, an independent school in Twickenham in South West London, where he shared lessons with Patsy Kensit, before moving on to Christ's Hospital School (also known as the "Bluecoat School"), a co-educational boarding school located south of the market town of Horsham in West Sussex. It was at Christ's Hospital that Greed gained the educational foundations that enabled him to move onto the Central School of Art and Design in London.

Life and career
Greed founded the company John Greed Design Ltd, the company has since grown into a major UK retailer of jewellery, making about 1000 transaction a day.

As well as operating a mail system the company maintained a small jewellery shop at Steep Hill in Lincoln, Lincolnshire, UK. until January 2012. They are rated as one of the top 2010 jewellery retailers in the UK by Plimsoll.

In July 2010 John Greed Design Ltd. became John Greed Jewellery Ltd. and opened a new flagship jewellery store at 314-315 High Street in Lincoln, in central England.

References

External links
John Greed Jewellery Website

British jewellery designers
Jewellery retailers of the United Kingdom
Living people
1966 births
People educated at Christ's Hospital
People educated at Newland House School
People from Wimbledon, London
Alumni of the Central School of Art and Design